Dato Sri Alexander Nanta Linggi (born 16 June 1958) is a Malaysian politician. He is Secretary-General of both Parti Pesaka Bumiputera Bersatu (PBB) and its coalition Gabungan Parti Sarawak (GPS). He has served as Minister of Works in the Pakatan Harapan (PH) administration under Prime Minister Anwar Ibrahim since December 2022. He served as the Minister of Domestic Trade and Consumer Affairs for the second term in the Barisan Nasional (BN) administration under former Prime Minister Ismail Sabri Yaakob from August 2021 to the collapse of the BN administration in November 2022 and his first term in Perikatan Nasional (PN) administration under former Prime Minister Muhyiddin Yassin from March 2020 to the collapse of the PN administration in August 2021 as well as the Deputy Minister of Rural and Regional Development in the Barisan Nasional (BN) administration under former Prime Minister Najib Razak and former Ministers Shafie Apdal and Ismail Sabri Yaakob from May 2013 to the collapse of the BN administration in May 2018. He has also served as the Member of Parliament (MP) for Kapit since November 1999.He is also cousin of Wilson Ugak Kumbong, the Deputy Minister in the Prime Minister's Department in charge of Sabah and Sarawak Affairs and MP for Hulu Rajang.

Personal life
Nanta is the grandson of former Sarawak leader Jugah anak Barieng and the son of former politician Leonard Linggi. He is also a businessman, having served as the Chairman of shipping company Swee Joo Bhd.

Political career
On 16 May 2013, after Nanta's victory in the 2013 Malaysian general election, he was appointed as Deputy Minister for Rural and Regional Development in the new Cabinet of prime minister Mohammad Najib Abdul Razak.

Election results

Honours
  :
  Commander of the Order of Meritorious Service (PJN) - Datuk (2010)

  :
  Knight Commander of the Most Exalted Order of the Star of Sarawak (PNBS) - Dato Sri (2020)

See also
 Kapit (federal constituency)

References

Living people
1958 births
People from Sarawak
21st-century Malaysian politicians
20th-century Malaysian politicians
Members of the Dewan Rakyat
Iban people
Parti Pesaka Bumiputera Bersatu politicians
Commanders of the Order of Meritorious Service
Knights Commander of the Most Exalted Order of the Star of Sarawak